The European Sumo Championships are two rival sumo competitions organized by the European Sumo Union (ESU) and the European Sumo Federation. A split occurred in 2012, where two rival championships were held, the ESU event taking place in Hungary on June 16–17 and the rival breakaway event taking place in Ukraine on the same weekend and officially recognized by the International Sumo Federation.

Summary of Championships
The list is incomplete

References

External links
European Sumo Federation

Sumo competitions
European championships